Migration is a Canadian animated short film, directed by Mark Lomond and Johanne Ste-Marie and released in 2014. Animated in the style of an old Super 8 nature documentary, the film depicts the migration of a strange creature returning to be with the rest of his kind.

The film received a Canadian Screen Award nomination for Best Animated Short Film at the 3rd Canadian Screen Awards, and a Jutra Award nomination for Best Animated Short Film at the 17th Jutra Awards.

References

External links

2014 films
Canadian animated short films
Quebec films
2010s Canadian films